is the 59th single of the Japanese group Morning Musume. It was released on August 19, 2015.

Members at time of single 
 9th generation: Mizuki Fukumura, Erina Ikuta, Riho Sayashi, Kanon Suzuki
 10th generation: Haruna Iikubo, Ayumi Ishida, Masaki Sato, Haruka Kudo
 11th generation: Sakura Oda
 12th generation: Haruna Ogata, Miki Nonaka, Maria Makino, Akane Haga

Track list

References

2015 singles
Zetima Records singles
Japanese-language songs
Morning Musume songs